Ophichthus longipenis, known commonly as the slender snake eel in Mexico, is an eel in the family Ophichthidae (worm/snake eels). It was described by John E. McCosker and Richard Heinrich Rosenblatt in 1998. It is a marine, tropical eel which is known from the eastern central Pacific Ocean, including Mexico, El Salvador, Guatemala, Honduras, Nicaragua, Costa Rica and Panama.

The species epithet "longipenis" means "long tail" in Latin. Due to its moderately wide distribution in its region, its lack of known threats, and lack of observed population decline, the IUCN redlist currently lists O. longipenis as Least Concern.

References

longipenis
Taxa named by John E. McCosker
Taxa named by Richard Heinrich Rosenblatt
Fish described in 1998
Fish of the Pacific Ocean